Tonkolili District is a  district in the Northern Province of  Sierra Leone. Its capital and largest city is Magburaka. The other major towns include  Masingbi, Yele,  Mile 91, Bumbuna, Yonibana, Matotoka. Mathora, Magbass and Masanga. Tonkolili District is home to the largest sugar factory in Sierra Leone, and one of the largest sugar factories in West Africa, that is located in the town of Magbass. Tonkolili District had a population of 530,776.

Tonkolili District borders Bombali District to the northwest, Kono District to the east, Kenema District and Bo District to the southeast, Port Loko and Koinadugu Districts.  Tonkolili is strategically located in the center of Sierra Leone. The district is criss crossed by many rivers including the Pampana River and Sierra Leone's longest river, the Rokel.

The Temne people make up the overwhelming majority of the population of Tonkolili District. The vast majority  of the population of Tonkolili District are Muslims.

Demographics 
The population is mostly Muslim and the people are largely from the Temne ethnic group.

.

Economy
Economically, there is significant potential for an extractive economy, specifically the mining of iron ore, bauxite gold and to a lesser extent diamonds. Today the biggest iron ore deposit in Africa and the third largest in the world, African Minerals Tonkolili Project, are found in the hills around Bumbuna, Mabonto and Bendugu. Agriculture also plays a significant role in the economy, the biggest bio energy company in Africa, Addax Petroleum, operates mostly in Mar in constituency 60. There is also a significant agricultural activity at the Magbass sugar production facility and refinery run by Complant, a Chinese construction engineering firm. A rubber factory is about to be established in the Mile 91 area. There are several hydroelectric power systems in the district, especially at Bumbuna. There is also as game reserve at Mamunta. However, economic development was hindered by the destruction of facilities during the 1991-2002 civil war.

Echo Bar Industry
Due to the intense nature of the Sierra Leone climate, the Tonkolili District has always had a vast harvest of cocoa beans each year. In 2003, the Echo Bars Ltd. Company lead a private acquisition of 85% of all cocoa production in the district. The chief taster, Echo Mufasa, (not to be confused with Mr. Eko) led this purchase to reasonable success, increasing production and efficiency in most areas of the cocoa production in the district. In 2009, the company went into recession and the land was rebought by the local government.

Education
Before the civil war, education was highly esteemed, especially in Arabic and English. Since the end of the conflict, schools have been rebuilt to a large extent and even new ones created, including an Arabic college. , the district was home to 310 primary schools which had nearly 74,000 students. It was also home to 15 secondary schools.

Government
Tonkolili District currently has nine Representatives in the Sierra Leonean Parliament, of which eight members were elected for a 5-year term.

Administrative divisions

Chiefdoms
The district is made up of eleven chiefdoms as the third level of administrative subdivision, with their administrative centres in parentheses listed below:

Gbonkolenken – Yele
Kafe Simiria – Mabonto
Kalansongoia – Bumbuna
Kholifa Mabang – Mabang
Kholifa Rowalla – Magburaka
Kunike – Masingbi
Kunike Barina – Makali
Malal Mara – Rochin
Sambaia – Bendugu
Tane – Matotoka
Yoni – Yonibana

Mining 
Tonkolili is the site of new iron ore mine, including a  railway between the mine and Port Pepel.  This railway to Port Pepel with an extension to deeper waters at Tagrin Point would be about 200 km long. While built by the African Minerals company, the railway would be open access to other users at commercial rates.  There is also a large deposit at Kasafoni.

References

External links 
Tonkolili District Council
  Tonkolili District at the Sierra Leone Encyclopedia 2006
 Warning of the health hazard in the Tonkolii district

Districts of Sierra Leone
Northern Province, Sierra Leone